Carlos Kirkpatrick (8 November 1907 – 22 March 1975) was a Spanish equestrian. He competed in the individual dressage event at the 1948 Summer Olympics.

References

1907 births
1975 deaths
Spanish male equestrians
Olympic equestrians of Spain
Equestrians at the 1948 Summer Olympics
Sportspeople from Madrid